The women's 50 metre butterfly event at the 2010 Asian Games took place on 18 November 2010 at Guangzhou Aoti Aquatics Centre.

There were 18 competitors from 12 countries who took part in this event. Three heats were held, the heat in which a swimmer competed did not formally matter for advancement, as the swimmers with the top eight times from the entire field qualified for the finals.

Defending champion Tao Li from Singapore won the gold medal again, Japanese swimmer Yuka Kato won the silver medal, Chinese swimmer Lu Ying won the bronze medal.

Schedule
All times are China Standard Time (UTC+08:00)

Records

Results

Heats

Final

References

 16th Asian Games Results

External links 
 Women's 50m Butterfly Heats Official Website
 Women's 50m Butterfly Ev.No.36 Final Official Website

Swimming at the 2010 Asian Games